Ann(e) or Annie Douglas may refer to:

Anne Ingram, Viscountess Irvine (1696–1764), English poet and wife of Colonel William Douglas
Anne Buydens (1919–2021), German-American film producer and wife of actor Kirk Douglas
Ann Douglas (historian), American academic; see Merle Curti Award
Annie Douglas Richards, fictional character on the U.S. soap opera Sunset Beach

See also
Anne Douglas Sedgwick, American-born British writer